This is a list of driver-less train systems, which are capable of GoA3 and GoA4 (GoA3+) according to the Grade of Automation classifications specified by the standard IEC 62290‐1. These are explained diagrammatically by the UITP. This list focuses heavily on trains in the classical sense used for large-scale railways for passengers and freight but does include a few people mover systems. For a similar list for GoA2, see list of semi-automated train systems.

Grade-of-Automation 3 systems 
These systems are capable of driverless train operation (DTO), although some operators may choose to staff trains anyway.

GoA3 – Americas

GoA3 – Asia

GoA3 – Europe

Grade-of-Automation 4 systems
These systems are capable of unattended train operation (UTO), although some operators may choose to staff trains anyway.

GoA4 – Americas

GoA4 – Asia

GoA4 – Europe

GoA4 – Oceania

Notes

References

Lists of railway lines
Public transport
Rail infrastructure
Automated